Aellopos titan, the Titan sphinx, is a moth of the family Sphingidae. The species was first described by Pieter Cramer in 1777.

Distribution 
It has been found all the way from Maine in the United States through Central America and south to Argentina and Uruguay in South America.

Description 
The wingspan is 55–65 mm. The body is dark brown with a wide white stripe across the abdomen. The wings are dark brown and the upperside of the forewing has a black spot at the end of the cell and two bands of translucent white spots. The upperside of the hindwing has pale patches along the costa and inner margin.

Biology 
Adults are on wing year round in the tropics. In the northern part of the range, adults are on wing in one generation with adults on wing from June to October. Adults feed on nectar of various flowers, including phlox, lantana and stoppers.

The larvae feed on Casasia clusiifolia, Cephalanthus occidentalis, Randia mitis, Randia monantha, Randia aculeata, Albizzia adinocephala and Randia grandifolia. There are at least two color morphs, a green and a reddish-brown form. Pupation takes place in loose cocoons in shallow underground chambers. The pupae are dark, smooth and shiny.

Subspecies
Aellopos titan titan - Brazil
Aellopos titan cubana (Clark, 1936) - Cuba

References

External links

Aellopos
Moths described in 1777
Moths of North America
Moths of South America
Taxa named by Pieter Cramer